Radar Records was a small independent New York City-based dance/garage label best known for Gary's Gang, Toney Lee, and various underground acts.

History

Foundation
It was formed and operated by Eric Matthew (real name Joe Tucci) around 1982.

Structure
First record issued by Radar Records was possibly "Knock Me Out" by Gary's Gang, following by the post-disco number "Reach Up" by Toney Lee. Label creation was mentioned on the March 1983 issue of Billboard magazine.

The label includes (sorted by chart success)
Toney Lee, who recorded "Reach Up" (Club #10, UK Pop #64)
Gary's Gang, who recorded various dance hits like "Runaway", "Makin' Music" (Club #8) and "Knock Me Out" (Club #25).
Fast Radio, who recorded  "Under My Thumb" (Club #47)
Status IV, who recorded  "You Ain't Really Down" (Club #48)
Barbara Fowler of Sinnamon, who recorded "Come And Get My Lovin'".

Radar Records was, after a couple of club hits, acquired by a Canada-based record company Unidisc Music. They also bought out other New York independent labels such as Prelude Records.

Selected discography

References

Companies based in Queens, New York
American independent record labels
Defunct record labels of the United States
Post-disco record labels
Record labels established in 1982
1982 establishments in New York City